WCSJ-FM is a radio station based in Morris, Illinois. As of 2010, the station is owned and operated by Nelson Multimedia Inc.

WCSJ's studios are located on Washington Street in downtown Morris with the FM transmitter located between Morris and Coal City. WCSJ's current sister station is WJDK-FM (95.7) with studios in the same building and a transmitter located between Kinsman and Seneca, Illinois.

WCSJ and WJDK are the only locally broadcasting stations in Grundy County. WCSJ-FM's programming includes local news, high school sports, a weekly fishing and outdoor program, and NASCAR racing.

History

WJDK
The station began broadcasting in 1993, holding the call sigh WJDK and airing an adult contemporary format. In 1997, the station was sold to Big City Radio.

WYXX
In February 1998, the station's call sign was changed to WYXX and it adopted a rhythmic oldies format branded "Chicago's Heart and Soul", simulcasting 103.1 WXXY in Highland Park, Illinois, with the station's call sign and adult contemporary format moving to 95.7. In August 1999, WYXX and WXXY adopted an 80s hits format as "The Eighties Channel," with the station patterned on high-energy CHR stations of the 1980s. The station featured longtime Chicago area radio personalities including Robert Murphy, Fred Winston, and Mark Zander.

In 2001, WYXX and WXXY adopted a Spanish hits format, branded "Viva 103.1". By January 2003, the station had ended its simulcast with WXXY, and adopted a dance hits format as "Party 103.1".

WCSJ-FM
In late 2003, the station was sold to Larry Nelson for $426,000. In January 2004, the station's call sign was changed to WCSJ-FM, and it adopted an adult standards format, carrying Timeless network programming from Citadel Broadcasting.  After the network's shutdown in February 2010, the station adopted a classic hits format.

References

External links

CSJ-FM
Grundy County, Illinois
Radio stations established in 1993
1993 establishments in Illinois
Classic hits radio stations in the United States
Full service radio stations in the United States